The Center for Public Leadership (CPL) is an academic research center at Harvard University that provides teaching, research and training in the practical skills of leadership for people in government, nonprofits, and business. Located at Harvard Kennedy School, CPL was established in 2000 through a gift from the Wexner Foundation.

Directors 
Hannah Riley Bowles and Deval Patrick currently serve as Co-Directors of the Center for Public Leadership.

Hannah Riley Bowles 
Hannah Riley Bowles, Roy E. Larsen Senior Lecturer in Public Policy and Management at HKS, was appointed Co-Director of CPL in May 2021 following the departure of Wendy Sherman. A leading expert on gender in negotiation, Bowles also chairs the HKS Management, Leadership, and Decision Sciences (MLD) Area and co-directs the HKS Women and Public Policy Program (WAPPP).

Deval Patrick 
In February 2022, former Massachusetts governor Deval Patrick joined Harvard Kennedy School as Co-Director of CPL and Professor of the Practice of Public Leadership.

Past Directors 
David Gergen, former presidential advisor who served during the administrations of Richard Nixon, Gerald Ford, Ronald Reagan, and Bill Clinton, served as CPL director from 2000 to 2018. Gergen was succeeded by American diplomat Wendy R. Sherman. Sherman directed CPL until early 2021, when she was appointed United States Deputy Secretary of State under President Joe Biden. Other past directors of CPL include Max Bazerman and Ron Heifetz.

Faculty affiliates
CPL affiliates include more than 40 faculty from across Harvard University, including Harvard Kennedy School, Harvard Business School, and the Harvard Graduate School of Education.

Fellowships
The Center for Public Leadership's fellowship programs provide tuition support and cohort-based co-curricular programming to students pursuing master's degrees at Harvard Kennedy School and other graduate schools across Harvard University.

 Bacon Environmental Fellowship — for students dedicated to preserving and enhancing our shared environment.
 Black Family Fellowship — for U.S. veterans and active duty military committed to public leadership.
 Emirates Leadership Initiative (ELI) Fellowship — for students from the United Arab Emirates and the Middle East looking to lead in a global marketplace.
 Fellowship for Serving African-American Communities (FSAAC) — for talented emerging leaders dedicated to improving the lives of the underserved in the U.S.
 George Leadership Fellowship — for joint-degree students at Harvard Kennedy School and Harvard Business School entering the private and public sectors.
 Gleitsman Leadership Fellowship — for entrepreneurs and agents of social change.
 U.S. Latino Leadership Fellowship — for leaders addressing disparities in Latino and underserved communities in the U.S.
 David M. Rubenstein Fellowship — for outstanding students innovating in public policy and business.
 Wexner Israel Fellowship — for inspired and active mid-career students from Israel.
 Zuckerman Fellows Program — for outstanding students in business, law, and medicine.

Research Initiatives 
The following research initiatives are based at the Center for Public Leadership.

 William Monroe Trotter Collaborative for Social Justice
 Social Innovation + Change Initiative
 Negotiation and Conflict Resolution Collaboratory
 Initiative for Responsible Investment
 Practicing Democracy Project

Hauser Leaders Program
The Hauser Leaders Program allows high-profile leaders from across sectors to join CPL for one-to-two semesters to advise students and lead events.

Hauser Institute for Civil Society 
Established through a grant by Rita and Gustave Hauser in 1997, the Hauser Institute for Civil Society (formerly the Hauser Center for Nonprofit Organizations) joined CPL in 2013. The Hauser Institute supports research and programming related to civil society and non-profit organizations. Hauser Institute initiatives include the Gleitsman Program in Leadership for Social Change, the Initiative for Responsible Investment, and the New World Social Innovation Fellowship.

Gleitsman Program in Leadership for Social Change
Through a gift of $20 million from the estate of Alan Gleitsman, the center endowed the Gleitsman Program in Leadership for Social Change in 2007. The program supports the annual Gleitsman International Activist Award and Gleitsman Citizen Activist Award, Gleitsman Leadership Fellows, and social change scholarship.

Gleitsman International Activist Award
 2020: Rt Hon Jacinda Ardern, Prime Minister of New Zealand
 2018 – Malala Yousafzai, Founder, Malala Fund and 2014 Nobel Peace Prize winner
 2015 – Fartuun Adan and Ilwad Elman, Founders, Elman Peace and Human Rights Center
 2013 – Sasha Chanoff, Founder and Executive Director, RefugePoint
 2011 – Teresa Ulloa Ziáurriz, Latin America and Caribbean regional director for Coalition Against Trafficking Women
 2009 – Karen Tse, founder of International Bridges to Justice
 2007 – Sakena Yacoobi, executive director of the Afghan Institute of Learning
 2005 – Han Dongfang, advocate of the worker's movement in China; Patrick Alley, Charmian Gooch, and Simon Taylor, founders of Global Witness
 2003 – Leaders in the fight against poverty: Fazle Hasan Abed, Founder of BRAC University (formerly Bangladesh Rural Advancement Committee); Jaya Arunachalam, Founder of the Working Women's Forum; Roman Imboden, Developer of the Multifunctional Platform; and Roy Prosterman, Founder of the Rural Development Institute
2001 – Bernie Krisher, Creator of Schools in Cambodia; Martin Macwan, Advocate of Dalit's Rights
1999 – Advocates for reconciliation in the Middle East: Mahmoud Abbas (Abu Mazen); Yossi Beilin; Bassem Eid; Yitzhak Frankenthal, Galia Golan, Faisal Husseini, Terje Rod Larsen and Mona Juul, Ahmed Qurie (Abu Ala), Uri Savir and Stanley Sheinbaum. Posthumous Awards in memory of Anwar Sadat, Yitzhak Rabin and King Hussein bin Talal of Jordan
1997 – Maria Adela Antokoletz, Argentinean founder of the Madres de Plaza de Mayo (Mothers of the Plaza de Mayo); Muhammad Yunus, Bangladeshi lender to the poor
1995 – José Ramos-Horta, East Timor independence advocate; Serge and Beate Klarsfeld, Nazi hunters
1993 – Nelson Mandela, Former African National Congress President; Wei Jingsheng, Advocate for Democracy in China.  Posthumous Awards in memory of Helen Joseph and Petra Kelly

Gleitsman Citizen Activist Award
 2017 – Congressman John Lewis, U.S. Representative, 5th district of Georgia
 2014 – Eric Greitens, Founder, The Mission Continues
 2012 – Rebecca Onie, co-founder and CEO of Health Leads
 2010 – Susan Burton, founder of A New Way of Life Reentry Project
 2008 – Bill Shore, founder of Share Our Strength
 2006 – Ron Grzywinski and Mary Houghton, founders of Shore Bank; Gloria Steinem, citizen activist; Julie Stewart, founder of Families Against Mandatory Minimums
 2004 – K-12 education advocates: Christopher Barbic, Yvonne Chan, Michael Feinberg & David Levin, Bertha Lewis, Michelle Rhee, Mark Rosenbaum, J.B.Schramm, Agnes Stevens, Margot Stern Strom, and Kevin Sved & Johnathan Williams
 2002 – Mike Farrell, activist and actor; Mimi Silbert, founder of Delancey Street Foundation
 2000 – Jack Kevorkian, end-of-life issues activist; Bryan Stevenson, founder and Executive Director, Equal Justice Initiative
1998 – Anti-Tobacco Advocates: Alan Blum, Stanton Glantz, Former Vice President Al Gore, former Washington Attorney General Christine Gregoire, C. Everett Koop, Janet Carol Mangini, Congressman Henry Waxman, Jeffrey Wigand, Merrell Williams, and Patricia Young
1996 – Geraldine Jensen, founder of the Association for Children for the Enforcement of Support; Tanya Tull, Founder of Beyond Shelter 
1994 – Wendy Kopp, Founder of Teach for America; Ralph Nader
1992 – Louis Clark, Executive Director of the Government Accountability Project; William Wassmuth, founder of The Northwest Coalition Against Malicious Harassment
1991 – Karen Nussbaum, co-founder of 9to5, National Association of Working Women; Ann Wilson, Chairperson of the Board of Commissioners, Housing Authority of the City of Milwaukee
1990 – Sophia Bracy Harris, co-founder of the Federation of Child Care Centers of Alabama; Deborah C. McKeithan, creator of four national organizations to act as support networks for the disabled

References

Harvard University
2000 establishments in the United States